Diamant Ramazani (born 18 February 1999) is a footballer who plays for Spanish club Almería B in Tercera Federación as a right-back.

Club career

Lokeren
On 7 March 2018, Ramazani signed his first professional contract with Lokeren for 3 years.

Almería B
On 21 September 2022, Diamant signed a one-year contract with Spanish club Almería B in Tercera Federación.

International career
Ramazani was born in Belgium to Burundian parents. Ramazani debuted for the Burundi national football team in a 1-1 2022 FIFA World Cup qualification tie with Tanzania on 4 September 2019.

Personal life
His younger brother Largie Ramazani is also a footballer. A winger, who plays for Spanish club Almería.

References

External links
 
 

1999 births
Living people
People from Sint-Agatha-Berchem
Burundian footballers
Burundian expatriate footballers
Burundi international footballers
Belgian footballers
Belgian expatriate footballers
Belgian people of Burundian descent
Association football fullbacks
K.S.C. Lokeren Oost-Vlaanderen players
Belgian expatriate sportspeople in England
Expatriate footballers in England
Footballers from Brussels
UD Almería B players